Kim Hae-Won (born 25 May 1999) is a South Korean football player.

Club career

A defender, Kim was a draftee pick for the Chunnam Dragons in 2009.  After 8 appearances (and one goal) in the K-League for the Dragons, Kim transferred to Daegu FC in the 2010 summer transfer window. Kim played his first match for his new club on 7 November 2010, in a 2–1 loss to his former club, the Dragons.

References

External links 

1986 births
Living people
Hannam University alumni
South Korean footballers
Jeonnam Dragons players
Daegu FC players
K League 1 players
Korea National League players
Association football defenders
Footballers from Seoul